Adela is a 2000 Argentine thriller film directed and written by Eduardo Mignogna. The film was based on the novel Le Coup de lune by Georges Simenon, adapted by François-Olivier Rousseau.  The film starred Eulalia Ramón and Grégoire Colin.

Plot
Bolivia, 1945. Two murders have been committed in Hotel Central, the inhospitable meeting point of the mixture of indigenous, Creole and European people who live in San Jacinto, a city of despair. Adela, the attractive owner's wife, blames Maria, one of the servants. But Timar, a young traveler, finds out some information that suggests a very different truth. In an oppressive atmosphere, where escaping seems to be the only thing that matters, Timar will struggle between his feelings for Adela and the injustice of convicting an innocent person. The risk of it is losing the few values he still has; the reward, experiencing love at its most.

Cast
 Eulalia Ramón as Adèle
 Grégoire Colin as Timar
 Martin Lamotte as Eugène
 Mario Gas as Kruger
 Isabel Vera as María
 Martín Adjemián as Enríquez
 Jordi Dauder as Gerente

Release
The film was released in Canada and Spain.

External links
 

2000 films
2000s Spanish-language films
Courtroom films
Films based on thriller novels
Films based on Belgian novels
Films based on works by Georges Simenon
2000 thriller films
Argentine thriller films
Spanish thriller films
2000s Argentine films